Annfield Plain  railway station was in County Durham in Northern England, on the original south section of the industrial Stanhope and Tyne Railway, which diverged from the East Coast Main Line south of Newcastle.

History
The station was opened by the North Eastern Railway, and it became part of the London and North Eastern Railway during the Grouping of 1923. The station then passed on to the Eastern Region of British Railways on nationalisation in 1948.

The station was closed by British Railways on 23 May 1955.

The site today

References

Notes

Sources
 
 
 
 Station on navigable O.S. map

Disused railway stations in County Durham
Former North Eastern Railway (UK) stations
Railway stations in Great Britain opened in 1894
Railway stations in Great Britain closed in 1955
Stanley, County Durham